The myth of the milk of Hera is an ancient Greek myth and explanation of the origin of the Milky Way within the context of creation myths. The standard telling goes that the mythical hero Heracles, as an infant, breastfed from an unsuspecting Hera, the goddess of marriage and Zeus's wife, who threw him away, causing a little bit of her milk to splash and create the galaxy with all its stars.

Etymology 

Mythology 
It was said that once Heracles had been born, either Zeus or his son Hermes took the infant and brought him to Hera, who was sleeping, and placed him in her breast so that he could suckle from her breasts. Once Hera woke up and understood what was going on, she chucked the baby away, as some milk spilt all over the place. This story was attributed to (pseudo-)Eratosthenes.

In another telling, after Alcmene managed to bring forth both infants, she grew fearful of Hera's wrath and imminent retribution, so she exposed the infant in some field. The goddess Athena, Heracles' half-sister, found him and brought him to Hera, without revealing his identity. Hera, admiring the baby, offered to breastfeed him. But Heracles bit too hard to her breast, hurting her and forcing Hera to cast him aside in pain, as Athena returned him to his mortal parents.

A version that diverges significantly from the more known ones states that the milk was not Hera's at all. According to the Roman mythographer Hyginus, when Rhea presented a swaddled rock to her husband Cronus pretending to be the infant Zeus, Cronus asked her to nurse the child one last time before he ate it. Rhea complied and pressed her breast against the rock, releasing a bit of milk. Hyginus, while recounting the more traditional story by Eratosthenes, supplants the infant Heracles for the infant Hermes, the son of the nymph Maia, instead.

Both Eratosthenes and Hyginus link Heracles breastfeeding Hera to his legitimation as an infant, since the only way for a son of Zeus to be able to receive honours in heaven was through being nursed by Hera, with Hyginus providing an additional example with Hermes. Neither Diodorus nor Pausanias make such connection between the breastfeeding and Heracles suckling from his father's wife breast; Diodorus mentions another ritual, which included a mock labour with Hera acting as Alcmene, as the way Heracles was legitimized after his apotheosis.

Whatever the details and the circumstances of the myth, it was said that the divine milk that spilt and sprayed across the heavens became the Milky Way galaxy, known to the ancient Greeks as Galaxias Kyklos. This rather dramatic myth has been depicted throughout history by many artists, including Tintoretto and Rubens.

In a lesser-known variant, some of the milk's portion that was released fell down on the earth, and transformed into a lily, a flower as white as Hera's milk.

See also 

 Milky Way (mythology)
 Heracles at the crossroads
 Five Suns

References

Bibliography 
 
 
 
 
 
 Hyginus, Astronomica from The Myths of Hyginus translated and edited by Mary Grant. University of Kansas Publications in Humanistic Studies. Online version at the Topos Text Project.
  Online version at Perseus.tufts project.
 Pausanias, Pausanias Description of Greece with an English Translation by W.H.S. Jones, Litt.D., and H.A. Ormerod, M.A., in 4 Volumes. Cambridge, MA, Harvard University Press; London, William Heinemann Ltd. 1918. Online version at the Perseus Digital Library.

External links 
 Star Tales – Milky Way
 

Milk in culture
Metamorphoses into flowers in Greek mythology
Deeds of Hera
Deeds of Zeus
Deeds of Athena
Deeds of Hermes
Mythology of Heracles
Astronomical myths
Creation myths
Metamorphoses in Greek mythology
Mythological food and drink